George L. Spaulding (December 26, 1864 – June 1, 1921) was an American composer.

Spaulding was born in Newburgh, New York. He studied piano with local teachers. When he was sixteen he moved to Brooklyn, where he studied harmony for a short time with an organist of that city. Since that time he was entirely self-taught. For many years he was in the music publishing and selling business, first as a music clerk, and then in partnership with others.

His first adventures in musical composition were in the form of popular songs. Among these were "The Volunteer Organist", "Two Little Girls in Blue", and others which had very large sales at the time.

It was discovered, however, that he had a splendid talent for writing simple piano pieces with well defined melodies and effective harmony. These he turned out in great number, among his most popular being:
"Sing, Robin", "Sing - Pretty Little Song Bird", "Airy Fairies", "Child's Good Night", "Dollie's Dream", "June Roses", "Just a Bunch of Flowers", "Mountain Pink" and "Dreaming Poppies".

His Tunes and Rhymes for the Playroom, Souvenirs of the Masters, and Well Known Fables Set to Music are among the most widely used collections of easy piano pieces in book form. Two little operettas for children, A Day in Flowerdom and The Isle of Jewels placed Spaulding in the front rank among writers of juvenile entertainment material. His wife, Jessica Moore, a talented poet, wrote many of his verses.

Spaulding's works have served an important purpose in juvenile education. His elementary technical books have also made an interesting place for themselves.

By far the greater majority of his works were published by the Theo. Presser Co.

References

External links

1864 births
1921 deaths
American male composers
American composers
Musicians from New Rochelle, New York